Pine Cliff was an unincorporated community in Washington Parish, Louisiana, United States. It was located   S of Franklinton, Louisiana. It was the site of a lumber plant in the early 20th century.

References

Unincorporated communities in Washington Parish, Louisiana
Unincorporated communities in Louisiana